Shinnecock Light was a lighthouse on the south side of Long Island, New York. The name comes from the Shinnecock Indian Nation.

The original red brick tower was built in 1858. If it were still standing it would be one of the ten tallest lighthouses in the US. It was discontinued in 1931 in favor of a skeleton tower and demolished by the Coast Guard in 1948.

References

Lighthouses completed in 1858
Lighthouses in Suffolk County, New York